InfiniteGraph is a distributed graph database implemented in Java and C++ and is from a class of NOSQL ("Not Only SQL") database technologies that focus on graph data structures. Developers use InfiniteGraph to find useful and often hidden relationships in highly connected, complex big data sets. InfiniteGraph is cross-platform, scalable, cloud-enabled, and is designed to handle very high throughput.

InfiniteGraph can easily and efficiently perform queries that are difficult to perform, such as finding all paths or the shortest path between two items. InfiniteGraph is suited for applications and services that solve graph problems in operational environments. InfiniteGraphs "DO" query language enables both value-based queries as well as complex graph queries. InfiniteGraph goes beyond graph databases to also support complex object queries. 

Adoption is seen in federal government, telecommunications, healthcare, cyber security, manufacturing, finance, and networking applications.

History
InfiniteGraph is produced and supported by Objectivity, Inc., a company that develops database management technologies for large-scale, distributed data management and relationship analytics. The new InfiniteGraph was released in May 2021.

Features

API/Protocols: Java, core C++, REST API
 Graph Model: Labeled directed multigraph. An edge is a first-class entity with an identity independent of the vertices it connects.
 Backup, including online incremental backup and full restore.
 Concurrency: Update locking on subgraphs, concurrent non-blocking ingest.
 Consistency: Flexible (from ACID to relaxed).
 Distribution: Lock server and 64-bit object IDs support dynamic addressing space (with each federation capable of managing up to 65,535 individual databases and 10^24 bytes (one quadrillion gigabytes, or a yottabyte) of physical addressing space).
 Processing: Multi-threaded.
 Cloud enabled
 Query Methods: "DO" Query Language, Traverser and graph navigation API, predicate language qualification, path pattern matching.
 Parallel query support
 Visualization: InfiniteGraph "Studio"
 Schema: Supports schema-full plus provides a mechanism for attaching side data.
 Transactions: Fully ACID
 Source: Proprietary, with open-source extensions, integrated components, and third-party connectors
 License Options: Free 50GB version + additional commercial and GSA pricing and license options
 Platforms: Windows and Linux with full interoperability

References

External links
 

Data analysis software
Proprietary database management systems
Graph databases
Distributed data stores
NoSQL products
Structured storage